Sitochori may refer to several places in Greece:

Sitochori, Messenia, a village in Messenia 
Sitochori, Evros, a village in the municipality of Didymoteicho, Evros regional unit
Sitochori, Larissa, a village in the Larissa (regional unit)
Sitochori, Serres, a village in the municipal unit of Achinos, Serres regional unit